The 1990 Massachusetts gubernatorial election was held on November 6, 1990. Incumbent Democratic Governor Michael Dukakis, his party's nominee for president in 1988, opted to not seek a fourth term. Republican Bill Weld won the open seat, beating Democrat John Silber to become the first Republican Governor of Massachusetts elected since 1970.

Democratic primary

Governor

Candidates
Francis Bellotti, former Lieutenant Governor and Attorney General of Massachusetts
John Silber, president of Boston University

Eliminated at convention
John H. Flood, State Representative from Canton

Withdrew
Evelyn Murphy, incumbent Lieutenant Governor

Declined
Raymond Flynn, Mayor of Boston
Michael Dukakis, incumbent Governor

Campaign
After Flynn's decision not to run, Murphy was the early frontrunner due to her strong name recognition and a solid base of liberal support. In July 1989, she led Bellotti 42% to 18% in a Boston Globe poll. That November, Bellotti had come within 2% of Murphy in another Boston Globe poll.

In January, Silber entered the race and Bellotti ran his first wave of television ads. By this point, Bellotti had taken the lead in the race, polling 38% to Murphy's 20% and Silber's 16%.

The Democratic Convention was held on June 2, 1990 at the Springfield Civic Center. On the first ballot, Bellotti received 42.9% of the vote, Murphy received 37%, Silber received 15.5%, and Flood received 4.5%. Silber's 15.5% gave him enough votes to remain on the ballot. On the second ballot, Bellotti won the convention with 51%, Murphy received 40%, and Flood received 8.5%. Flood was not able to stay on the ballot as he did not receive the necessary 15%.

Murphy's campaign appeared to be badly hurt by the public perception that she was close to the unpopular Dukakis and therefore tried to make a break with the Dukakis Administration. Dukakis twice postponed a trade mission to Europe because Murphy hinted at a news conference that she would execute her own economic plan while serving as acting governor. After the incident, Murphy's unfavorable rating rose to 49% in a Boston Globe/WBZ-TV poll, compared to 38% a month earlier.

A week before the primary, Evelyn Murphy dropped out of the race and threw her support to Bellotti.

Results
Despite having Murphy's support and as high as a 15-point lead in the polls at one point during the campaign, Bellotti was upset by Silber, a political outsider who had run a provocative campaign filled with controversial statements known as "Silber Shockers".

Lieutenant Governor

Candidates
Marjorie Clapprood, State Representative from Sharon
William B. Golden, State Senator from Weymouth
Nicholas Paleologos, State Representative from Woburn

Declined
Evelyn Murphy, incumbent Lieutenant Governor (to run for Governor)

Results
Clapprood easily won the nomination, defeating her nearest opponent by over 22%.

Republican primary

Governor

Candidates
Steven Pierce, State Representative from Westfield
William Weld, former United States Attorney for the District of Massachusetts

Eliminated at convention
Paul W. Cronin, former U.S Representative from Andover

Withdrew
Guy Carbone, former commissioner of the Metropolitan District Commission (to run for Attorney General)
Len Umina, resident of Marlborough (to run as an independent)

Declined
Paul Cellucci, State Senator from Hudson (to run for Lieutenant Governor)
Edward J. King, former Governor

Campaign
At the Republican Convention, Pierce received 2,672 votes (52.6%), Weld received 1,845 (36.3%), and Cronin received 563 (11.1%). Cronin was not able to run in the primary because he did not receive the 15% necessary to make the ballot. Pierce received enough votes to have a "supermajority", which made Pierce the officially endorsed candidate of the Republican Party.

During the campaign, Weld attacked Pierce's anti-abortion stance while Pierce claimed that Weld had changed his position on abortion. Pierce also touted his ability to win a House seat in a Democratic district, while Weld had lost to the Democratic front-runner for governor Francis Bellotti in the 1978 Attorney General's race.

Results
Despite losing the convention and trailing Pierce in the polls, Weld was able to come-from-behind and defeated Pierce in the Republican primary.

Lieutenant Governor

Candidates
Paul Cellucci, State Senator from Hudson (running with Weld)
Peter G. Torkildsen, State Representative from Danvers (running with Pierce)

Results
State Senator Paul Cellucci, Weld's running mate, defeated State Representative Peter G. Torkildsen, Pierce's running mate, for the Republican nomination.

General election

Candidates
John Silber, President of Boston University (Democratic)
Leonard Umina, software executive (Independent High Tech)
Bill Weld, former U.S. Attorney for the District of Massachusetts and U.S. Assistant Attorney General (Republican)

Leonard Umina, a 38-year old computer executive, ran under the Independent High Tech Party banner. The Independent High Tech Party, of which Umina was a founding member, campaigned on a platform of establishing an independent state agency that would store all government documents on a publicly-accessible mainframe to ensure government accountability and transparency. On economic issues, the High Tech Party refuted the economic policies of the Reagan years and advocated the funneling of money to the poor. Four other candidates ran under the Independent High Tech label for statewide offices in 1990.

At least two other candidates ran for governor.  Dorothy L. Stevens was a single mother that ran as a write-in candidate after withdrawing from a campaign for the Democratic nomination.  Her platform included a $10 minimum wage and an expansion of welfare benefits.  Mark A. Emanation was the candidate of the Socialist Workers Party.

Campaign
Silber's lead in the polls vanished after his outburst in an interview with WCVB-TV's Natalie Jacobson. His blunt personality and controversial comments led many Democrats to vote for Weld.

Results
Bill Weld defeated John Silber to become the state's first Republican Governor since Francis W. Sargent.

As of 2018, this is the most recent gubernatorial election in which Amherst, Cambridge, Leverett, Shutesbury and Wendell each voted for the Republican candidate.

Results by county

See also
 1990 Massachusetts general election, for other races held alongside this one
 1989–1990 Massachusetts legislature, for the legislature in office during this election
 1991–1992 Massachusetts legislature, for the legislature elected alongside Weld

References

1990
Gubernatorial
Massachusetts
Bill Weld